Mont des Poilus is a  mountain summit located in Yoho National Park, in the Canadian Rockies of British Columbia, Canada. Its nearest higher peak is Mount Baker,  to the north. Both are part of the Waputik Mountains.

History
It was named by Arthur Wheeler one week following the armistice which ended World War I to honor the Poilu, the common soldiers of the French Army.

The first ascent of Mont des Poilus was made 1901 by James Outram, Edward Whymper, guided by C. Kaufmann, C. Klucker and J. Pollinger.

The mountain's name became official in 1924 when approved by the Geographical Names Board of Canada.

Geology
Mont des Poilus is composed of sedimentary rock laid down during the Cambrian period. Formed in shallow seas, this sedimentary rock was pushed east and over the top of younger rock during the Laramide orogeny. The Glacier des Poilus lies on the east aspect of the peak, and is part of the larger Waputik Icefield.

Climate
Based on the Köppen climate classification, Mont des Poilus is located in a subarctic climate zone with cold, snowy winters, and mild summers.

See also
Geography of British Columbia

References

External links
 Parks Canada web site: Yoho National Park
 Mont des Poilus weather: Mountain Forecast
 Climbing Mont des Poilus: Explor8ion.com
 BC Geographical Names: Mont des Poilus

Three-thousanders of British Columbia
Canadian Rockies
Mountains of Yoho National Park
Kootenay Land District